Monsignor Patrick Joseph Whitney (1894 - 1942), was an Irish priest who in 1932 founded the Saint Patrick’s Society for the Foreign Missions known as the Kiltegan Fathers.

Whitney was born in Ballyfermoyle, between Keadue and Lough Key in Co. Roscommon, on the borders with Co. Sligo and Co. Leitrim. He was educated locally and at St. Mel's College, Longford.

He was training as a priest in Maynooth College for the  Diocese of Ardagh and Clonmacnoise when on the invitation of Bishop, Joseph Shanahan, he volunteered as a priest in Nigeria where he went with Fr Thomas Roynane in the 1920s. His cousin Fr Patrick Francis Whitney was one of the first three members of the society.

In 1939 due to ill health, he returned to Ireland and was replaced as Prefect Apostolic of Ogoja in Nigeria, by future Bishop Thomas McGettrick.

References

1894 births
1942 deaths
Alumni of St Patrick's College, Maynooth
People from County Roscommon